The North Christian Church is a church in Columbus, Indiana. Founded in 1955, it is part of the Christian Church (Disciples of Christ). The church building of 1964 was designed by Finnish-American architect Eero Saarinen (1910–1961) and completed in 1964. Saarinen's father Eliel Saarinen had designed the First Christian Church in Columbus.

Below the spire, there is an oculus that admits light into the main level. The sanctuary is located at the center of the building, with the Lord's Table located in the center of the sanctuary. Rows of pews surround the altar in a hexagon, reflecting the idea that worship should be a central aspect of the life of the congregation. The lower level contains classrooms, an auditorium, a kitchen, and an activities area.

History
In 1955, 43 members of the First Christian Church, designed by Eliel Saarinen, decided to found a new church affiliated with the Disciples of Christ. After some time of worshiping in each other's homes, in 1956 they purchased  of land with the help of Irwin Miller. Although Miller wanted to hire Eero Saarinen to design the new church, he believed it was important that the congregation choose the architect themselves:

Symbolism in design

Saarinen believed that modern churches had lost the monumentality of traditional cathedrals because expansions with Sunday schools, gymnasiums, and kitchens took away from the significance of the church itself. He wanted to design a building that returned to the model of a traditional church, while still using Modern architecture that served the needs of the congregation.

His compromise was to move the school, meeting rooms, auditorium, and kitchen to a hidden basement, so that the only visible part of the church above ground was the sanctuary. Space for the basement was carved out of the earth in a hexagonal shape, reflecting the sanctuary above it. This emphasized the importance of the church itself and isolated the sanctuary as the most important part of the building.

He was inspired by the steep steps at Angkor Wat and Borobudur, where the visitor has to interact with the architecture and work to reach the sanctuary. He thought that building an entire church on one level made religion "too easy", and took away from the spiritual experience of going to church. Therefore, he chose to elevate the sanctuary of the church so people had to climb up a set of stairs to reach it. This way the church also stood out from its residential neighborhood.

Sanctuary
The act of entering a church was important to Saarinen as well, so the environment changes to reflect the change of attitude one has when entering a sacred space. The grey slate floors, dark mahogany pews, and eerie natural lighting instill a sense of awe in the visitor. The primary light source into the sanctuary is the oculus at the base of the spire, directly above the Communion table. This focus of light draws attention to the center of the room, where the Communion takes place.

The room was designed as a space where people can gather in unity and harmony in an enclosed spiritual world. The Communion table, consisting of twelve pedestals symbolic of the twelve disciples, is placed on a tiered platform. The highest pedestal at the end of the table represents Christ, and hold a silver chalice and loaf of bread for the service. It is the central focus of the sanctuary because it is an important part of the Disciples of Christ service. The congregation sits around it facing each other as a community.

The pulpit, choir loft, and a Holtkamp organ is situated opposite the main entrance into the sanctuary. The organ is the last of its kind designed by Walter Holtkamp Sr.

Spire

From the outside of the building, the spire symbolized reaching upwards to God; on the inside, it created an enclosed soaring space for the congregation. The church was intended to remove man from the earthly world, so instead of being anchored to the ground with solid rectangles, Saarinen used pointed angular forms that hover and point to the heavens. At the top of the spire is a  gold leaf cross, symbolizing Christ's sacrifice.

Baptistery
The baptistery is a small space, decorated with a sunburst design, symbolizing the Holy Trinity. It is separate from the main sanctuary, designed to give the ceremony more dignity. The separation between the baptistery and sanctuary also recalls the tradition of the Early Christian church, when only those who were baptized could attend Communion.

Influence
The North Christian Church was one of the most copied buildings from the mid-twentieth century. Although it did not generate much interest during Saarinen's life, the decades that followed produced copies of the building all across the America. It was the last building Saarinen designed before his death, and he thought it was one of his greatest achievements:

Recent history
As the membership has decreased and upkeep costs have increased, the congregation has begun to have difficulty raising the necessary funds for maintenance of the structure. In April 2018, the Indiana Landmarks historic preservation organization added the church to its list of 10 Most Endangered Indiana landmarks to raise awareness of the problem and find ways to save it.

In 2019, Landmark Columbus received a 2019 Keeping it Modern Architectural Conservation Grant from the Getty Foundation for the iconic church. With this grant, Landmark Columbus—together with Prudon & Partners, Reed-Hilderbrand, Bryony Roberts Studio, Enrique Ramirez, ICR-ICC and others—are developing a conservation management plan to provide the historical context and strategic guidance necessary for the church's long-term upkeep.

On July 16, 2022, the congregation held a "Celebration of Life" service for the building. The church is now permanently closed and no longer allowing tours of the building.

References

External links

 Church Main Page

Buildings and structures in Columbus, Indiana
Eero Saarinen church buildings
Modernist architecture in Indiana
Churches on the National Register of Historic Places in Indiana
Churches completed in 1964
20th-century churches in the United States
National Historic Landmarks in Columbus, Indiana
Christian Church (Disciples of Christ) congregations
Churches in Bartholomew County, Indiana
National Register of Historic Places in Bartholomew County, Indiana